Osman Hussein is a Sudan politician who has served as acting prime minister of Sudan since 19 January 2022, following the resignation of Abdalla Hamdok on 2 January.

He was the general secretary of the office of Prime Minister from 13 March 2019 until 19 January 2022.

References

Living people
Prime Ministers of Sudan
21st-century Sudanese politicians
Year of birth missing (living people)
National Congress Party (Sudan) politicians